Alexander Keith Brister (born 19 December 1993) is an English footballer who plays as a defender.

Club career 

On 6 April 2014, Brister joined FC Honka on loan after training with the club earlier in the week. Prior to his loan move he made ten appearances for the Fulham Under-21 team in the 2013–14 season.

Brister made his Veikkausliiga debut on the opening day of the 2014 season, playing the entirety of a 4–3 away loss to MYPA. Brister scores his first goal for the club, in his next appearance despite losing 2–1 against MYPA.

Brister was one of several players to be released by Fulham at the end of the 2013–14 season.

He spent the 2015 season with Norwegian side Notodden, appearing for the first team and the second team in the third-tier and fifth-tiers respectively.

References

External links 

1993 births
Living people
Sportspeople from Epsom
English footballers
Association football defenders
Fulham F.C. players
FC Honka players
Notodden FK players
Veikkausliiga players
English expatriate footballers
English expatriate sportspeople in Finland
Expatriate footballers in Finland
English expatriate sportspeople in Norway